Sybille Bammer was the defending champion, but chose not to participate that year.

Agnieszka Radwańska won in the final 6–2, 1–6, 7–6(4), against Jill Craybas.

Seeds

Draw

Finals

Top half

Bottom half

External links
Draw and Qualifying Draw

Singles
Pattaya Women's Open - Singles
 in women's tennis